XHMPJ-FM is a Mexican radio station on 91.5 FM in San José del Cabo, Baja California Sur. The station is operated by Grupo Larsa Comunicaciones and owned by Luis Roberto Márquez Pizano; it carries a Spanish adult hits format known as Toño.

History
In 2015, the IFT made available a Class A social station frequency for San José del Cabo. Two applicants filed for the frequency: Fundación Radiodifusoras Capital Jalisco and Luis Roberto Márquez Pizano. On February 14, 2018, the IFT awarded the station to Márquez Pizano on diversity criteria as being related to the fewest stations among the applicants.

XHMPJ signed on February 29, 2020, leased to Grupo Larsa Comunicaciones. It flipped to El Heraldo Radio in September 2020 and then to Super Stereo Miled in October 2021.

References

Radio stations in Baja California Sur
Radio stations established in 2020
2020 establishments in Mexico